Abbeville is a city in, and the parish seat of, Vermilion Parish, Louisiana, United States,  west of New Orleans and  southwest of Baton Rouge. The population was 12,257 at the 2010 census. At the 2020 population estimates program, the population of the city was 11,927. Abbeville is the principal city of the Abbeville micropolitan statistical area, which includes all of Vermilion Parish. It is also part of the Lafayette metropolitan statistical area and the larger Lafayette–Acadiana combined statistical area.

History 
Formerly called La Chapelle, the land that became Abbeville was purchased by founding father Père Antoine Désiré Mégret (Père is French for 'Father'), a Capuchin missionary on July 25, 1843 for $900. There are two theories how the town was named. The theory that is generally accepted is Mégret named the town after his home in France. The second theory which also cannot be discounted states that it is a combination of "Abbe" for Abbé Mégret and "ville" the French word for town – thus Abbé's town. Some support for the second theory is found because the town in France is pronounced "Abbville" by its denizens. However, in 1995, Fr. Jean Desobry discovered the diocesan archives of Amiens the proof of Mégret's birthplace. In the archive, the dossier of Fr. Antoine Jacques Désiré Mégret was found, and that he was born on May 23, 1797, at Abbeville and became founder of Abbeville in Louisiana. Dr Mary-Theresa MacCarthy wrote in her article Un Autre Abbeville in the 1996 edition of Bulletin de la Société des Antiquaires de Picardie (translation by Father Herbert),

On February 12, 1844, the pastor gave to his American town the name of the town of his birth. Residents find this name especially fitting because of the French word abbé which means father [or priest] added to the French word ville [which means town]. Their Abbeville is truly la ville de l'abbé [the priest's town].

Settlers were primarily descendants of the Acadians from Nova Scotia that moved to the area around 1766 to 1775. The town was incorporated in 1850.
There were two people living on the land at the time, Joseph LeBlanc and his wife Isabelle Broussard, whose former home Father Megret converted into a chapel. The chapel burned in 1854, and in 1910 St. Mary Magdalen Catholic Church, Rectory were built, its and cemetery established, and still stand today.

Father Megret modeled his original plan for the village after a French Provincial village. It was bounded on the north by St. Victor Boulevard, on the south by Lafayette Boulevard, on the east by "the Sisters of Charity", and on the west by Bayou Vermilion. At this point in time the town was called "Abbville".

The center of downtown is Magdalen Square, which is accented by large oak trees, a fountain, and gazebo. A statue in memory of Father Megret stands in the square. In 1856, the Last Island Hurricane destroyed every building in the town.

Geography
Abbeville is located near the southern terminus of U.S. Highway 167. Abbeville Chris Crusta Memorial Airport is in the eastern part of the city. The Vermilion River runs through downtown, and several canals and coulees run through other parts of Abbeville.

Climate

Demographics

According to the 2000 U.S. census, there were 11,887 people, 4,698 households, and 3,014 families residing in the city. At the 2020 population estimates program, 11,927 people lived in the city. By the publication of the 2020 United States census, there were 11,186 people, 4,761 households, and 2,752 families residing in the city.

In 2000, the racial and ethnic makeup was 54.29% White, 38.56% African American, 0.19% Native American, 5.50% Asian, 0.39% other races, and 1.06% two or more races. Hispanic or Latino Americans of any race were 1.93% of the population. In 2000, 76.0% of the population over the age of five spoke English at home, 16.5% of the population spoke French or Cajun, and 5.5% spoke Vietnamese. The 2019 American Community Survey estimated the racial and ethnic makeup was 49.6% non-Hispanic white, 42.8% African American, 0.5% Native American, 4.8% Asian, 0.9% some other race, and 1.3% two or more races.

The 2010 U.S. census reported there were 4,698 households, of which 60.34% had children under the age of 18 present, 33.35% were married couples living together, 24.44% had a female householder with no husband present, and 36.72% were non-families; 31.55% of all households were made up of individuals, and 12.32% had someone living alone who was 65 years of age or older. The average household size was 2.53 and the average family size was 3.20.

In 2019, the median household income was $38,900. Males had a median income of $46,182 versus $37,958 for females; approximately 30.4% of the population lived at or below the poverty line.

Economy
Abbeville is an agricultural trade and processing center for rice, sugarcane, dairy products, locally sold corn, cotton, and seafood, in particular crawfish, alligator, and crab. The oil and natural gas fields off the coast in the Gulf of Mexico are serviced by companies throughout the region including Abbeville. Chemical products and consumer goods are manufactured locally. A related tourist attraction is a large open-kettle sugarcane syrup mill.

Education 
The city of Abbeville is served by the Vermilion Parish School District. The following are public and parochial schools in Abbeville:
 Elementary Schools
 Eaton Park Elementary
 Herod Elementary
 Mount Carmel Elementary School (Parochial) (Grades PK–8)
 Middle Schools
 J.H. Williams Middle School
 High Schools
 Abbeville High School
 Vermilion Catholic High School (Parochial)
 Lighthouse Christian Prep. (Parochial)
 James A. Herod High School and Elementary School (Was founded by Reverend James A. Herod for the education of the black population of Vermilion Parish with grades first thru twelfth, he was also a teacher)

Recreation
Abbeville is home to several festivals:
 Daylily Festival and Garden Show
 Giant Omelette Celebration
 Les Lumieres du Village d'Abbeville
 Louisiana Cattle Festival
 Vermilion Carousel of Arts

The Abbey Players' Theater is a prominent local playhouse in Abbeville. The Acadian Museum is east of the city in nearby Erath, Louisiana. Avery Island, which contains a bird sanctuary, salt dome, and world-famous Tabasco factory is 15 miles southeast of the city.

Historic buildings 
Abbeville is the home of numerous historic buildings that have been added periodically to the National Historic Register. Starting in 1987, the Abbeville Commercial Historic District, in the area surrounded by Concord, State, Lafayette, and Jefferson Streets, was added to the register. That same year, the Abbeville Residential Historic District was created between W. Oak, State, Cherry, and the Vermilion River. St. Mary Magdalen Church, Rectory, and the Cemetery were added the following year. In the 1990s, the Ovide Broussard House, Chauviere House, Gordy House, Lyons House, and the Caldwell House were all added, in addition to the Downtown Abbeville Historic District, which is bounded by State, 1st, Pere Megret, and Concord St and the Vermilion Bayou. Finally, just before the turn of the century, the Richard Cattle Auction Barn and the St. Mary Congregational Church were both added. North of Abbeville, A La Bonne Veillee was added in 1984.

National Guard
Abbeville is the home of HHC (headquarters company), 2nd Battalion, 156th Infantry (mech.), of the Louisiana Army National Guard. The 2nd Battalion served with the 256th Infantry Brigade ("The Tiger Brigade") during Operation Iraqi Freedom in 2004–2005.

Transportation
The Louisiana & Delta Railroad has a route through the city, which helped bring freight produced locally to market.

The Freshwater Bayou Deepwater Channel connects Abbeville to the Gulf of Mexico, and the Intracoastal Waterway runs south of the city.

Films
The 1988 remake of the 1958 film The Blob was filmed in Abbeville.

Part of Lucio Fulci's Door to Silence takes place in Abbeville.

Robert J. Flaherty chose Abbeville in 1948 as his base of operations during the filming of Louisiana Story. He rented a house in the current downtown area for 15 months over 1946–47.

Abbeville is one of the main locations in the first season of the HBO TV series True Detective.

Notable people 
 George A. Caldwell (1892–1966), building contractor convicted in the Louisiana Hayride scandals of 1939-1940; born in Abbeville.
 Bobby Duhon, (born 1946), professional American football player.
 Bobby Charles Guidry (1938–2010), songwriter and musician, wrote See You Later Alligator & Walking to New Orleans; born in Abbeville.
 Sammy Kershaw, (born 1958), a country music artist, born in nearby Kaplan, resides in Abbeville.
 Dudley J. LeBlanc, (1894–1971), businessman and politician who made a fortune in the 1950s in the patent medicine Hadacol, lived most of his life and died in Abbeville.
 Anthony Levine, (born 1987), professional American football player; born in Abbeville.
 Gerald Long, (born 1944), state senator from Natchitoches; formerly resided in Abbeville
 Brandon Mitchell, (born 1975), former professional American football player; born in Abbeville.
 George Petty (1894–1975), pin-up artist; born in Abbeville.
 Deb Richard, (born 1963), golfer, winner of five LPGA Tour tournaments.
 Sam H. Theriot (born 1954), member of the Louisiana House of Representatives from 1979 to 1996; former Vermilion Parish clerk of court; educator and Abbeville native.
 Koryn Hawthorne (born 1997), contestant and finalist on the season 8 of The Voice
 Golden J. Zenon Jr. (1929–2006), architect; born in Abbeville.

Footnotes

References

External links
 City of Abbeville, Louisiana

 
Cities in Louisiana
Cities in Vermilion Parish, Louisiana
Acadiana
A
Populated places established in 1843
1843 establishments in Louisiana
Cities in Lafayette, Louisiana metropolitan area